The 1909 Howard Bulldogs football team was an American football team that represented Howard College (now known as the Samford University) as a member of the Southern Intercollegiate Athletic Association (SIAA) during the 1909 college football season. In their first year under head coach John Longwell, the team compiled an 5–2–1 record.

Schedule

References

Howard
Samford Bulldogs football seasons
Howard Bulldogs football